WGSQ (94.7 FM, "Country Giant 94.7") is a radio station licensed to serve Cookeville, Tennessee, United States. The station is owned by Cookeville Communications, LLC.

WGSQ broadcasts a country music format to the Upper Cumberland Area. Syndicated weekday programming includes Big D & Bubba  and CMT After Midnite with Cody Alan.

The station was assigned the call sign WGSQ by the Federal Communications Commission on December 21, 1981.

References

External links
WGSQ official website

GSQ
Country radio stations in the United States
Putnam County, Tennessee
Radio stations established in 1981